Timoney is a surname. Notable people with the surname include:

 Bill Timoney (born 1958), American actor, voice actor, director, script writer and producer
 John Timoney (police chief) (1948−2016), Chief of Police of Miami from 2006
 John Timoney (politician) (1909–1961), Irish Clann na Poblachta politician
 Pádraig Timoney (born 1968), Irish artist

See also
Timoney Technology Limited of Ireland
McTimoney College of Chiropractic, chiropractic college, managed and operated by BPP University in Abingdon, Oxfordshire, England